is a non-scrolling platform game developed and published by Sigma Enterprises. It was released in Japan in November 1982.  The goal is to collect all of the fruits and vegetables in each level. Ponpoko was sold in North America by Venture Line as a conversion kit starting in January 1983.

Gameplay
Colorful creatures (called hairy caterpillars by Sigma, scorpions by Venture Line) move horizontally from one side of the screen to the other and back again, floating over gaps in the platforms. A mystery pot usually gives bonus points when collected, but sometimes one will release a snake. Both caterpillars and snakes are deadly to the touch.

Reception 
In Japan, Game Machine listed Ponpoko on their August 15, 1983 issue as being the fifteenth most-successful table arcade unit of the month.

References

External links

1982 video games
Arcade video games
Arcade-only video games
Sigma games
Platform games
Video games about dogs
Video games about raccoons
Video games developed in Japan